Global and Planetary Change is a monthly peer-reviewed scientific journal covering research into the earth sciences, particularly pertaining to changes in aspects thereof such as sea level and the chemical composition of the atmosphere. It has been published by Elsevier since it was established in 1989. The editors-in-chief are Alan Haywood, Jed Kaplan, Trude Storelvmo, Liviu Matenco, Zhengtang Guo, Maoyan Zhu, Fabienne Marret-Davies, Howard Falcon-Lang. According to the Journal Citation Reports, the journal has a 2021 impact factor of 5.114.

References

External links 
 

Earth and atmospheric sciences journals
Planetary science journals
Publications established in 1989
Elsevier academic journals
Monthly journals
English-language journals